Operator Toll Dialing was a telephone call routing and toll-switching system for the Bell System and the independent telephone companies in the United States and Canada that was developed in the 1940s. It automated the switching and billing of long-distance calls. The concept and technology evolved from the General Toll Switching Plan of 1929, and gained technical merits by the cutover of a new type of crossbar switching system (No. 4XB) in Philadelphia to commercial service in August 1943. This was the first system of its kind for automated forwarding of calls between toll switching centers, but it served customers only for regional toll traffic. It established initial experience with automatic toll switching for the design of a nationwide effort that was sometimes referred to as Nationwide Operator Toll Dialing.

By the time of first public promotions of Nationwide Operator Toll Dialing to the general telecommunication industry in 1945, c. 5% of the 2.7 million toll board calls per day were handled by the early incarnations of this system.

Operator Toll Dialing eliminated the need for intermediate operators to complete toll calls to distant central offices, where it eliminated the inward operators for call completion to the local wire line. This system involved stepwise routing from one toll center to another one logically closer to the destination to set up each circuit.

An essential aspect of the eventual success of the system was the concept of destination code routing, which required a uniform telephone numbering plan for all telephone networks across the continent. By 1947, a newly devised nationwide numbering plan established a geographic partitioning of the continent into numbering plan areas (NPAs), and designated the original North American area codes. The area code are unique three-digit codes serving as destination routing codes to each numbering plan area (NPA). Within each NPA, central offices also received unique three-digit codes, so that each central office could be reached by a six-digit dialing prefix, and each telephone on the continent was uniquely identified by a telephone number of ten digits. This numbering plan freed operators from determination and use of trunk codes different at each toll switching center. Instead, switching systems were supplemented with apparatus for machine translation of the universal area codes to location-specific trunk codes.

By the end of 1948, AT&T commenced the wider use of the system with the cutover of new crossbar switching systems for toll-dialing in New York and Chicago, which resulted in the handling of about ten percent of all Bell System long-distance calling by Operator Toll Dialing. Altogether, the toll networks enabled operators to place calls directly to distant telephones in some three-hundred cities. On average, it took about two minutes for a long-distance call to be completed to its destination. As foreseen and stated in 1949, the target goal for call completion, after full implementation of the system across the nation was one minute.

For entering the destination codes and telephone numbers into newly designed machine-switching equipment, long-distance operators did not use a slow rotary dials, but a ten-button key set, operating at least twice as fast, which transmitted tone pulses (multi-frequency signaling) over regular voice channels to the remote switching centers. Such channels were incapable of transmitting the direct-current pulses of a rotary dial.

Operator Toll Dialing was gradually supplemented and superseded by Direct Distance Dialing (DDD) in the decades following. With DDD, customers themselves dialed an area code followed by a seven-digit telephone number to initiate long-distance calls without operator assistance. Activated first in 1951 for about ten thousand customers in Englewood, NJ, DDD was available in the major cities by the early 1960s, but was not fully implemented until the 1970s.

See also
Notes on the Network
Trunk prefix
Subscriber trunk dialling (STD)

References

Bell System
Public sphere
Telecommunications systems
Telephony